Group 4 of the 1958 FIFA World Cup took place from 8 to 17 June 1958. The group consisted of Austria, Brazil, England, and the Soviet Union.

Standings

 The Soviet Union finished ahead of England by winning a play-off

Matches
All times listed are local time.

Brazil vs Austria

Soviet Union vs England

Brazil vs England

This was the first goalless draw in World Cup finals history.

Soviet Union vs Austria

England vs Austria

Brazil vs Soviet Union

Play-off: Soviet Union vs England

References

External links
 1958 FIFA World Cup archive

1958 FIFA World Cup
Brazil at the 1958 FIFA World Cup
England at the 1958 FIFA World Cup
Soviet Union at the 1958 FIFA World Cup
Austria at the 1958 FIFA World Cup